Redistricting in Wisconsin is the process by which boundaries are redrawn for municipal wards, Wisconsin State Assembly districts, Wisconsin State Senate districts, and Wisconsin's congressional districts. Redistricting occurs—as in other U.S. states—once every decade, usually in the year after the decennial United States census. According to the Wisconsin Constitution, redistricting in Wisconsin follows the regular legislative process, it must be passed by both houses of the Wisconsin Legislature and signed by the Governor of Wisconsin—unless the Legislature has sufficient votes to override a gubernatorial veto. Due to legislative gridlock, however, it has become common for Wisconsin redistricting to be conducted by courts. The 1982, 1992, and 2002 legislative maps were each created by panels of United States federal judges.

The most recent redistricting occurred in April 2022, as the Wisconsin Supreme Court picked a Republican gerrymander for the 2022–2031 decade. The new maps represent only minor changes from the 2011 maps, which were regarded as one of the most dramatic partisan gerrymanders in the country. The decision was brought to the Court after the Legislature and Governor could not agree on a map.

Background

Reapportionment of representatives between the states every ten years based on new census figures is required by Article I, Section 2 of the U.S. Constitution and Section 2 of the Fourteenth Amendment. The Constitution, Supreme Court jurisprudence, and federal law allow significant latitude to the individual states to draw their congressional and legislative districts as they see fit, as long as each district contains roughly equivalent numbers of people (see Baker v. Carr, Wesberry v. Sanders, and Reynolds v. Sims) and provides for minority representation pursuant to the Voting Rights Act.

Article IV of the Constitution of Wisconsin mandates that redistricting must occur in the first legislative session following the publication of a new enumeration by the United States census. The Assembly must have between 54 and 100 districts, and the Senate must have no more than one-third and no less than one-quarter of the members of the Assembly. The Wisconsin Constitution further specifies that the boundary of a Senate district cannot cross the boundary of an Assembly district, that the boundary of an Assembly district cannot cross a ward boundary, and that districts should be "in as compact form as practicable".

Since the Wisconsin Constitution mandates that a State Senate district cannot divide a State Assembly district, and since U.S. Supreme Court and Wisconsin Supreme Court opinions require roughly equal representation for each state legislative district, all State Senate districts in Wisconsin are composed of a collection of exactly three State Assembly districts. This system was first formally established in a highly contentious 1972 redistricting plan (1971 Wisc. Act 304). Prior to 1972, counties were allocated a specific number of Assembly districts based on populations, and Senate districts might contain between 1 and 6 Assembly districts.

Process
The redistricting process begins with each decennial census, when the U.S. government provides detailed census tract data to the states, usually by March 1 of the first year of the decade. In Wisconsin, the state then provides the data to the counties, and each of Wisconsin's 72 counties—in collaboration with the counties' municipal governments—draws new county board and municipal ward boundaries. Counties are required to submit draft boundaries within 60 days of receiving the census data, and no later than July 1 of the first year of the decade. Over the 60 days beginning that July 1, counties and municipalities are directed to come to agreement on their final ward plan and update the county district plan to reflect the agreed wards. Collaboration is necessary because, while the county government ultimately controls the county board districts, the municipal ward boundaries are defined by the municipal governments, and the county board must adhere to the ward lines drawn by the municipalities in the formation of county districts. Wisconsin law does not require wards to be equal in population, but does specify a range depending on the size of the municipality:
 For municipalities with a population of 150,000 or greater, wards must contain between 1,000 and 4,000 people.
 For municipalities with a population between 39,000 and 149,999, wards must contain between 800 and 3,200 people.
 For municipalities with a population between 10,000 and 38,999, wards must contain between 600 and 2,100 people.
 For municipalities with fewer than 10,000 people, wards must be between 300 and 1,000 people.
 Municipalities with fewer than 1,000 people are not required to divide into wards.
If any municipality fails to submit a ward plan by the statutory deadline, any voter living in the municipality can submit a plan to the Wisconsin circuit court which has jurisdiction over that municipality, and the court can either adopt that plan or amend the plan as they see fit. The municipality can still supersede a plan imposed under such circumstances by passing their own ward plan. Ward lines are required to remain stable for the decade and cannot be changed after a plan is adopted.

After the wards have been drawn, counties are directed to hold public hearings on the county district plan. Cities are given another 60 days to draw new aldermanic districts based on the new ward lines. Aldermanic districts, unlike ward boundaries, can be changed with a 2/3 vote of the municipal council. Towns and villages, under Wisconsin law, elect their boards at-large and do not draw aldermanic districts.

The Wisconsin Legislative Research Bureau compiles the county and ward data, with detailed population statistics, into a database which is usually ready by September 1. From there, typically the two major parties will each devise one or more preferred legislative maps for their parties interests, usually prioritizing their partisan advantage, but also considering interests such as (a) protecting incumbents, (b) maintaining influence in particular geographic areas, (c) tending to the concerns of a particular interest group or population or industry, etc. From there, the legislative process plays out between the legislature and the governor, with influence and lobbying from external parties with their own interests in the outcome.

Since 1983, the Wisconsin Legislature and Governor have only been able to successfully pass a redistricting law once—in 2011, when Republicans held full control of state government. In 1992 and 2002, with the Legislature and Governor unable to reach an agreement, the state maps were drawn by panels of United States federal judges. Divided government in 2021 and 2022 again resulted in a court-ordered plan.

Reform attempts
For over a century in Wisconsin, there have been movements to implement a nonpartisan redistricting commission to draw state legislative districts, rather than leaving it in the hands of a partisan legislature or an arbitrary judicial panel. This was briefly adopted with the redistricting commissions of the mid-20th century, the most famous being the Rosenberry Commission of the 1950s. The current Governor, Tony Evers, has again attempted to empower a nonpartisan commission. In 2020, he created a new redistricting commission by executive order, with its members chosen by a panel of Wisconsin state judges. A number of Wisconsin cities and counties have passed "advisory referendums" indicating their support for a nonpartisan redistricting commission.

History

The original Wisconsin Constitution of 1848 specified the exact boundaries of the 19 original State Senate districts and 66 original Assembly districts in Article XIV, Section 12, and the 2 original congressional districts in Article XIV, Section 10. The first congressional redistricting occurred during the 1st Wisconsin Legislature (1848), after the United States Congress allocated a third congressional district to Wisconsin (1848 Wisc. Act 11).

Congressional reapportionment after the 1860 United States census added three more congressional districts to the state of Wisconsin. The 14th Wisconsin Legislature drew the new congressional districts (1861 Wisc. Act 238). The 1870 United States census resulted in the addition of two additional congressional districts. Wisconsin added 1 more seat in the 1880, 1890, and 1900 reapportionments. The 11th congressional district was eliminated following the 1930 United States census. The 10th congressional district was eliminated following the 1970 United States census. The 9th congressional district was eliminated following the 2000 United States census.

The first state legislative redistricting occurred in the 5th Wisconsin Legislature (1852 Wisc. Act 499) in which the Legislature added six Senate districts and sixteen Assembly districts. As new counties were organized under the state government, additional redistricting was necessitated and new districts were added rapidly in the first 12 years. In the 9th Wisconsin Legislature (1856 Wisc. Act 109) the number of senators was increased from 25 to 30 and the number of representatives was increased from 82 to 97. The number was increased again in 1861 (1861 Wisc. Act 216), when the number of senators increased to 33 and the number of representatives increased to the constitutional maximum, 100.

Although the United States Supreme Court would, in the 21st century, specify that state legislative districts had to represent a roughly equal number of inhabitants, that requirement did not exist in the early years of Wisconsin's history, and the early State Legislature districts had wide variations in population representation. That changed in Wisconsin when the Wisconsin Supreme Court asserted a requirement for more uniformity in legislative district population in the 1892 court cases which collectively established what was referred to as the "Cunningham Principles" for redistricting.

The U.S. Supreme Court's strict interpretation of "one person-one vote" resulted in the decision to reduce the Assembly from 100 seats to 99 in 1972 and adopt the model of three Assembly districts per Senate district. This new process also opened the door to more elaborate districts, no longer constrained by county boundaries. Whether due to the changed rules or due to changing politics, since 1972 a court-ordered compromise has been necessitated in three of the next four redistricting cycles.

Cunningham cases (1892)
The first major court case resulting from redistricting in Wisconsin occurred in 1892. The 1890 election had given Democrats full control of state government for the first time in decades. The Legislature passed a plan that was signed by Governor George Wilbur Peck. Republicans balked at the electoral implications, as well as the large number of split-county districts in the new map. Republicans sued the Secretary of State, Democrat Thomas Cunningham, in the Wisconsin Supreme Court to prevent the utilization of the new districts for the 1892 election. Democratic attorney and politician Edward S. Bragg, who was hoping to be chosen as United States Senator by the next Democratic Legislature, worked as counsel for the Secretary of State in defending the redistricting plan. Republican Charles E. Estabrook, the former Attorney General, worked as counsel for the Republican plaintiffs.

In the case State ex rel. Attorney General v. Cunningam the State Supreme Court struck down the map. Justice Harlow S. Orton wrote for the majority that: (1) the maps did not properly account for the population of non-taxed Native Americans and members of the Army and Navy who were not currently located in the state; (2) the districts did not closely adhere to county lines; and that districts were not properly (3) contiguous, (4) compact, and (5) convenient. The court also found that the districts varied too widely in population, with the most populous Senate district being nearly twice the population of the smallest.

The Legislature went back to work and, in a special 1892 session, passed another redistricting map (1892 Wisc. S.S. 1 Act 1). Although this map adhered more closely to county lines, it still varied widely in district population, and was again challenged by Republicans in the Wisconsin Supreme Court. The Court again, in September 1892, ruled in favor of the Republicans and struck down the map in State ex rel. Lamb v. Cunningham. The Legislature passed a third and final plan in October 1892, in a second special session (1892 Wisc. S.S. 2 Act 1). The final plan was signed October 27, just 12 days before the 1892 general election, when almost all of the nominations had already been submitted. Due to the extreme lateness of the maps, further legislation was needed to clarify the status of the existing nominations and the necessary process for getting nominees on the ballot for the new districts.

Later referred to as the "Cunningham Principles" the 1892 court cases established the role of the State Supreme Court in adjudicating legislative maps, and set the precedent that districts should adhere to county lines and strive for uniformity in district population.

Consequences for 1890s elections
Although Democrats made large gains in the State Senate in the 1892 election, they lost seats in the Assembly. In the 1894 election, Republicans regained the majority in both chambers. The maps, therefore, did not appear to have a significant partisan implication. This also occurred in an era when Wisconsin still had two opportunities for legislative redistricting per decade, and a second redistricting was passed in a February 1896 extraordinary session of the Legislature, which reverted many of the districts to their pre-1892 boundaries (1896 Wisc. S. S. Act 1).

Rosenberry Commission (1950s)

By 1950, it had been nearly 30 years since the Wisconsin Legislature had passed a full redistricting plan. The 1931 law (1931 Wisc. S.S. Act 27) made only minor changes to the 1921 plan, and no redistricting act was passed subsequent to the 1940 census. The Legislature's inaction led to a lawsuit on constitutional grounds, but the Wisconsin Supreme Court ruled in State ex rel Martin v. Zimmerman that they could not compel the Legislature to pass a redistricting plan. With the population changes since 1920, the districts had fallen far from the goal of equal representation and the issue had begun to cause political agitation in the state. In 1950, responding to public pressure, the Legislative Council created an apportionment study committee, composed of two senators, three representatives, and three members of the public. The committee was chaired by recently retired Chief Justice Marvin B. Rosenberry and came to be known as the "Rosenberry Commission".

Within four months, the commission produced a plan for redistricting which would restore equal representation in district populations, but it struggled to win majority support in the Republican-dominated Legislature. The measure was fiercely opposed by rural legislators and farm interests, who demanded an alternative scheme to allow the Senate to be redistricted based on land area and population, as opposed to basing it solely on attempting to achieve equal population representation in districts. A compromise was eventually reached, in which the Legislature passed the Rosenberry plan (1951 Wisc. Act 728) with a provision which delayed implementation until voters could register their opinion on the question of using land area as criteria for drawing districts. The question was put to voters in the 1952 fall general election, and voters defeated the requirement for land-based representation.

Nevertheless, Wisconsin Republicans and Republican-aligned interest groups did not give up on the idea, and, in the 1953 Legislature, proposed a new constitutional amendment to require land-based criteria for the drawing of Senate districts. This time the referendum appeared on the Spring 1953 ballot; with roughly half the turnout of the Fall election, the amendment was narrowly approved. Republicans in the Legislature took this as permission to rewrite the Rosenberry plan and draw Senate districts which fit the new constitutional requirement.

The Legislature passed 1953 Wisc. Act 242, which they deemed as superseding Rosenberry, and 1953 Wisc. Act 550 which amended a number of Assembly districts. The new districts were quickly challenged in a number of state court cases. In State ex rel. Thomson v. Zimmerman the Wisconsin Supreme Court nullified the 1953 referendum, ruling that the ballot language did not properly describe the constitutional change being proposed. They further ruled that it was unconstitutional for the Legislature to enact more than one redistricting per decennial census unless Section 3 of Article IV of the Wisconsin Constitution were amended to allow it. Following the Supreme Court ruling, the Rosenberry plan was utilized for the remainder of the 1950s.

Consequences for 1950s elections
Immediately after the Rosenberry maps took effect, in the 1954 election, Republicans lost their super-majority in the Assembly, dropping to their smallest majority since 1942. In 1958, the Democrats won control of the Assembly for the first time since 1932.

Reynolds cases (1960s)

In the 1960s, with the state then under divided government, redistricting proved even more difficult. They again attempted to utilize a Legislative Council Committee of legislators and citizens as they had in 1950. In 1961, however, the Council Committee map was referred to the full Legislature without the endorsement of the Committee. The Republican Legislature did not pass the Committee map and failed to pass any other map that year. As in the 1950 reapportionment saga, Republicans continued attempting to utilize geographic area as criteria in the drawing of districts, which the Democratic Governor, Gaylord Nelson, rejected.

Governor Nelson, called a special session in 1962 to deal with the issue, but then vetoed the congressional and legislative maps produced by the special session. A congressional redistricting plan was finally passed by overriding the Governor's veto in July, but legislative redistricting remained stalled. The Senate attempted to pass a redistricting plan via joint resolution, which would bypass the Governor, but the Assembly did not agree that it would be constitutional. In the meantime, the Democratic Attorney General, John W. Reynolds Jr., had gone to federal court seeking a resolution. The U.S. District Court appointed former Wisconsin Supreme Court justice Emmert L. Wingert as special master to investigate the issue. Judge Wingert eventually reported that he believed the redistricting suit should be dismissed and found no evidence that the failure to redistrict would result in "discrimination". The court accepted his recommendation and dismissed the suit, though they did warn that the issue could be renewed if no redistricting plan was passed by August 1963.

The 1962 elections produced the same divided government configuration, with a Republican Legislature and John Reynolds, the former Attorney General, now Governor. Once again, the Legislature passed a Republican-approved map, and the Democratic Governor vetoed it. Finally, in July 1962, the Assembly and Senate concurred on passing a joint resolution to bypass the Governor. Reynolds, however, brought suit to the Wisconsin Supreme Court, which ruled in State ex rel. Reynolds v. Zimmerman that the Wisconsin Constitution did not permit the Legislature to bypass the Governor in redistricting and further stated that if no new plan was enacted by May 1, the court would produce its own map by May 15.

A last-ditch effort was made by the Legislature, but their final attempt was again rejected by Governor Reynolds, who criticized the partisan bias of the map, calling it "a fraud upon the people".

On May 14, 1964, the Wisconsin Supreme Court issued its own plan in a filing in State ex rel. Reynolds v. Zimmerman  (23 Wis. 2d 606). The new plan was embraced by Governor Reynolds, who called it, "the culmination of my four-year fight for equal voting rights for the people of the state of Wisconsin."

Consequences for 1960s elections
In the first election under the court-ordered map (1964), Democrats gained the majority in the Assembly, but Republicans quickly regained the majority in 1966 and there was little change in the composition of the Senate.

Equal representation requirement (1972)
The 1970s redistricting cycle was the first to occur in Wisconsin after the federal government had formalized the "one-person, one-vote" mandate, written into the intent of the Voting Rights Act of 1965 and verified by the United States Supreme Court.  This presented technical challenges for redistricting in Wisconsin, due to several provisions of the State Constitution:
 First and foremost, the State Constitution set out the clear requirement that no Senate district could divide an Assembly district, thus every Senate district must be composed of one or more whole Assembly districts.  With the Senate at 33 members and the Assembly at 100, they obviously could not create an equal distribution of 100 seats into 33.  
 The State Constitution also set 100 as the maximum number of Assembly districts, and set the maximum number of Senate seats at one third of the Assembly, so it was impossible to achieve an equal ratio of Assembly to Senate seats without eliminating a seat.
 The State Constitution also strictly required that members of both chambers be chosen in single-member districts, so the option of reaching equal representation through use of larger multi-member districts was also not possible.
 The State Constitution further stated that Assembly districts adhere to county, precinct, town or ward lines, which, for 124 years, was interpreted to strictly respect county boundaries. This was also one of the issues litigated in the 1892 Cunningham cases, with the Wisconsin Supreme Court stating that county lines should be adhered to.

Once again, Wisconsin was under divided government, with the Senate in Republican control and the Assembly and Governorship held by Democrats. Despite the state losing a seat in the U.S. House of Representatives, the congressional redistricting was accomplished with bipartisan support before the end of 1971 (1971 Wisconsin Act 133). Legislative redistricting took a back seat for the year, as many in the Senate and Assembly were resigned to leaving the process to the courts.

Democratic state representative Fred Kessler led the effort to produce a map which took radical new steps to meet the "one-person, one-vote" requirement. The Kessler plan reduced the Assembly size from 100 seats to 99, and established the three Assembly districts per Senate district ratio to make it possible to achieve roughly equal-population districts in the Assembly and Senate. The plan further called for abandoning the adherence to county boundaries, which had previously served as the basis for Assembly district assignments. On the county question, Kessler stated, "I'd say it's completely and totally impossible to follow county lines and meet the court's requirements." The Assembly Elections Committee backed Kessler's plan, and the Senate concurred on the need to go to 99 districts and abandon county lines, but the two chambers remained divided on the final map. Kessler suggested his plan was drafted to maximize party competition and alleged the Senate plan attempted to maximize Republican partisan advantage.

In early 1972, at the urging of Senate Republican leader Ernest Keppler, Governor Patrick Lucey appointed a commission to evaluate the redistricting plans to try to come to a consensus. The commission's work stalled, however, as the chairman, former State Supreme Court justice James Ward Rector, was opposed to the crucial change in consideration of county boundaries, and the commission found it was impossible to write a map with equal representation while honoring county lines. Republican commission member Stanley York noted that they could perhaps achieve both goals by simultaneously amending the district lines and the county lines. The commission broke in February, unable to come to consensus.

The matter went back to the Legislature, which attempted to resolve the issue in a conference committee. But again, the committee deadlocked, and the Legislature appeared prepared to let the issue go to the courts for resolution. The Wisconsin Supreme Court, prompted by Attorney General Robert W. Warren, declared that the existing 1964 boundaries were now unconstitutional due to population changes and needed to be redrawn. They gave the Legislature until April 17 to pass a plan, and vowed that the court would again enact its own plan if the Legislature failed.

Governor Lucey called a special session of the Legislature to deal with redistricting in April, as Republicans sought action from the State Supreme Court and Democrats sought a plan from the U.S. District Court in Milwaukee. The Supreme Court agreed to extend its deadline to April 24 to allow the Legislature to work. The Legislature eventually came to a compromise plan which prioritized preservation of incumbents while adopting the Kessler changes to enable the plan to achieve equal-representation. The result was declared a gerrymander, but constitutional. The redistricting plan was ultimately passed late in the evening of April 21, 1972 (1971 Wisc. Act 304).

Consequences from 1972 plan
Under the 1972 map, Democrats won a majority in the State Senate for the first time since 1892 and maintained their majority in the Assembly. In the congressional redistricting, one Republican district was eliminated and in 1976 the Democrats reached a 7–2 majority in the congressional delegation. Though these partisan results were likely also driven by the national mood, which had turned decisively against Republicans due to the Watergate scandal.

The 1972 plan was also noteworthy for abandoning the adherence to county boundaries in the redistricting process, which led to more elaborate districts and gerrymanders in subsequent years.

Federal court intervention (1982)
In the 1980s redistricting cycle, in an inversion of the 1960s and 1970s, the Democrats were in control of the State Legislature with a Republican Governor, Lee S. Dreyfus. A stalemate ensued once again, with the Democratic Legislature passing their preferred plan and Governor Dreyfus issuing a veto. With the impasse stretching into 1982, a lawsuit was filed in federal court seeking a resolution. On February 5, 1982, U.S. District Judge Terence T. Evans indicated that if a plan was not signed into law by April, the court would order their own plan. Later that month, the federal court declared that the current legislative districts had become unconstitutional due to population changes in the 1980 census. In the spring of 1982, the Legislature and Governor were able to agree on the congressional reapportionment, but remained at an impasse over legislative redistricting. Governor Dreyfus sought to have the case removed to the Wisconsin Supreme Court, but the case was ultimately retained by a three-judge panel of the Eastern District of Wisconsin.

With no plan in place in May 1982, the court made another threat—that they could slash the size of the State Legislature as punishment for the government's inability to come to a compromise. A last-ditch effort by the Legislature was again vetoed by the Governor. In June 1982, the court ordered its own plan and admonished the state government for failing to come to an agreement. Legislators and journalists noted at the time that the map was clearly drawn in a way to punish incumbents, and drew 53 of the 138 state legislators in incumbent-vs-incumbent races.

The court order did not settle reapportionment for the decade, however, as the Democratic Legislature remained discontent over the new maps. They received further incentive in the 1982 election, where Democrat Tony Earl was elected to succeed Republican Lee Dreyfus as governor. In the spring of 1983, Governor Earl called a special session of the Legislature to draw up a new redistricting plan. Within a month, the Democratic plan was passed into law and signed, and a new court battle ensued. In the spring of 1984, the federal court struck down the Democratic plan, ordering the state to revert to the 1982 court-ordered plan. State Democrats, however, appealed the ruling to the United States Supreme Court. The U.S. Supreme Court stayed the District Court order in June, and, after hearing arguments, maintained the stay and allowed the 1983 redistricting plan to supersede the 1982 court-ordered plan.

Consequences from the 1980s redistrictings
Politically, Democrats gained 2 seats in the Senate, but there was no change in the Assembly partisan makeup. Historically, the court-ordered Assembly district numbers appear as a strange aberration in historical data. The 1983 act which superseded the court-order saw more of a shift back towards Republicans, though Democrats remained in the majority in both houses of the Legislature through to the next redistricting cycle.

Walker/Fitzgerald gerrymander (2011)
In the 2010 elections, Republicans won significant majorities in both houses of the Legislature and the governorship. Republicans used their majorities to pass a radical redistricting plan after the 2010 census which substantially shifted the partisan bias of the state legislative maps and the state congressional map (2011 Wisc. Act 43). The redistricting process also broke with state procedure by publishing their prescribed legislative district map before the counties and municipalities had completed the process of drawing wards. The Legislature further ordered that municipalities and counties were directed to draw ward lines to comply with the legislative district boundaries set by the state government—legally inverting the bottom-up redistricting process into a top-down process. The map itself was the product of a Republican project known as REDMAP, created to maximize the partisan bias of redistricting by utilizing new statistical and mapping software.

Several lawsuits were brought against the 2011 redistricting plan. A set of early challenges against the plan—alleging various Equal Protection Clause violations—were consolidated in the case Baldus v. Members of the Wisconsin Government Accountability Board. The ruling in that case dismissed most of the plaintiffs claims, citing that, while the districts clearly were drawn to partisan benefit, the population distribution was roughly equal. The court made only minor alterations to two districts in the Milwaukee area, which the court ruled violated Section 2 of the Voting Rights Act by improperly diluting the population of Latinos across two districts.

Following this defeat, another lawsuit was brought on equal protection grounds which offered a novel methodology for measuring the partisan impact of gerrymandering. The inability to quantify the severity of a partisan gerrymander had previously been cited by the U.S. Supreme Court as a factor limiting federal courts from providing a remedy. In the case of Whitford v. Gill, a panel of federal judges agreed that the 2011 redistricting act represented an unconstitutional partisan gerrymander, and adopted their own three-part test to determine the validity of a district map: (1) was the map intended to place a severe impediment on the effectiveness of the votes of individual citizens on the basis of their political affiliation, (2) does the map actually have that effect, and (3) can the map be justified on any other, legitimate legislative grounds. The case was appealed to the U.S. Supreme Court, and was one of a number of redistricting challenges that went before the high court in the latter part of the decade. The Supreme Court ultimately ruled that the plaintiffs in Whitford lacked standing, remanding the case to the lower court, where it was later dismissed. The more significant gerrymandering case of that term, however, was Benisek v. Lamone, dealing with a Maryland gerrymander, where the Supreme Court stated that redistricting was an inherently political question that the court could not adjudicate.

Consequences from 2011 plan
The 2011 Wisconsin redistricting has been one of the most successful partisan gerrymanders in the history of the country, entrenching Republican majorities in both houses of the Wisconsin Legislature with near supermajorities. The bias of the 2011 map was best illustrated in the 2018 Fall election, when Democrats won every statewide race, and won 53% of the statewide legislative vote, yet only won 36 of the state's 99 Assembly seats.

"Least changes" mandate (2021–2022)
During the 105th Wisconsin Legislature (2021–2022), Wisconsin had a Democratic Governor, Tony Evers, and a Republican-controlled Legislature. Both sides proposed new maps, but there was no hope of a compromise. State Republicans pre-emptively requested that the Wisconsin Supreme Court change their rules to try to ensure that they retain original jurisdiction over redistricting challenges, rather than allowing cases to appear before state trial courts or federal courts. The Supreme Court rejected the request at that time, but would ultimately accept jurisdiction in the fall.

Governor Evers attempted to empower a nonpartisan commission to draft a redistricting proposal, and created a commission by executive order for that purpose. A number of Wisconsin cities and counties passed "advisory referendums" indicating their support for a nonpartisan redistricting commission. Ultimately, the commission produced a set of maps that Evers accepted and utilized in the litigation that ensued.

The 2020 redistricting cycle was further complicated by delays and controversies involving the 2020 United States census, which was impacted by the COVID-19 pandemic and significant litigation. The United States Census Bureau announced in March 2021 that they would not meet their deadlines, and ultimately did not release detailed census-tract data until August 12, 2021—about five months behind schedule.

In response to the census delays, Republicans in the 105th Wisconsin Legislature sought to delay the county and municipal redistricting process, which would have had the effect of pushing the legislative redistricting beyond the 2022 elections. This ultimately was not necessary.

Following the precedent of the 1980, 1990, and 2000 redistricting cycles, Wisconsin Democrats filed suit in the U.S. District Court for the Western District of Wisconsin, seeking a court-ordered redistricting plan.  Republican advocates, the Wisconsin Institute for Law and Liberty, in turn, requested the Wisconsin Supreme Court take up their own redistricting case. The Wisconsin Supreme Court accepted the case in September, breaking with their precedent of the past fifty years.

In the meantime, Republicans asked the United States Supreme Court to kill the federal redistricting case pursued by Democrats; the U.S. Supreme Court declined to act, but ultimately the federal court deferred to the state supreme court.

The Wisconsin Supreme Court ruled in November 2021, in a 4–3 decision on ideological lines, that the standard they would use to draw new maps would be to seek the "least changes" to the existing maps necessary to comply with the new census data. Several parties submitted their preferred legislative maps to the Court, adhering to their "least changes" guidance. Governor Evers' proposal was eventually chosen by the Court in a 4–3 decision in March 2022. Evers map was shown to move the fewest number of voters into new districts from the 2011 plan.

The Supreme Court of the United States took the radical step of throwing out the Wisconsin Supreme Court's legislative maps in an unsigned opinion on March 23, 2022, leaving the Wisconsin 2022 legislative elections in limbo. The maps were thrown out because of the alleged technical process-fault of not considering sufficient perspectives on the question of racial gerrymandering in the creation of a new majority-black Assembly district.

A few weeks later, the Wisconsin Supreme Court returned and simply selected the Republican proposal which had been submitted prior to their March decision. Although this map had the same process defect as the Democratic map.

Wisconsin redistricting laws and court orders
 Article XIV, Wisconsin Constitution, 1848
 1848 Wisc. Act 11, grew from 2 to 3 congressional districts.
 1852 Wisc. Act 499, expanded to 25 senators and 82 representatives.
 1856 Wisc. Act 109, expanded to 30 senators and 97 representatives.
 1861 Wisc. Act 216, expanded to 33 senators and 100 representatives.
 1861 Wisc. Act 238, grew from 3 to 6 congressional districts.
 1866 Wisc. Act 101
 1871 Wisc. Act 156
 1871 Wisc. Act 157, made an amendment to 1871 Wisc. Act 156.
 1872 Wisc. Act 48, grew from 6 to 8 congressional districts.
 1872 Wisc. Act 70, reconfigured the Monroe Assembly districts.
 1876 Wisc. Act 343
 1882 Wisc. Act 242
 1882 Wisc. Act 244, grew from 8 to 9 congressional districts.
 1887 Wisc. Act 461
 1891 Wisc. Act 482, struck down by court, never utilized.
 1891 Wisc. Act 483, grew from 9 to 10 congressional districts.
 1892 Wisc. S.S. 1 Act 1, struck down by court, never utilized.
 1892 Wisc. S.S. 2 Act 1
 1896 Wisc. S.S. Act 1
 1901 Wisc. Act 194, for 1901 Assembly redistricting.
 1901 Wisc. Act 309, for 1901 Senate redistricting.
 1901 Wisc. Act 398, grew from 10 to 11 congressional districts.
 1911 Wisc. Act 661
 1921 Wisc. Act 470
 1931 Wisc. S. S. Act 27, made only minor changes
 1931 Wisc. S. S. Act 28, reduced from 11 congressional districts to 10.
 1951 Wisc. Act 728, Rosenberry Plan, went into effect in 1954 elections.
 1953 Wisc. Act 242, attempt to replace Rosenberry Plan, struck down by court, never utilized. 
 1963 Wisc. Act 63, congressional redistricting, overrode gubernatorial veto.
 State ex rel. Reynolds v. Zimmerman, 23 Wis. 2d 606 (1964), legislative redistricting ordered by the Wisconsin Supreme Court.
 1971 Wisc. Act 133, reduced from 10 congressional districts to 9.
 1971 Wisc. Act 304, reduced the Assembly to 99 seats, set 3:1 relationship of Assembly to Senate seats.
 1981 Wisc. Act 154, congressional redistricting.
 1981 Wisc. Act 155, amended 1981 Wisc. Act 154.
 Wisconsin State AFL-CIO v. Elections Board, 543 F. Supp. 630 (1982), legislative redistricting ordered by United States District Court for the Eastern District of Wisconsin.
 1983 Wisc. Act 29, superseded the court-ordered 1982 map, initially struck down by the United States Court of Appeals for the Seventh Circuit, but the decision was later stayed by the Supreme Court of the United States, and the map was utilized for the remainder of the 1980s.
 1991 Wisc. Act 256, congressional redistricting.
 Prosser v. Elections Board, 793 F. Supp. 859 (1992), legislative redistricting ordered by United States District Court for the Western District of Wisconsin.
 Baumgart v. Wendelberger (2002), legislative redistricting ordered by United States District Court for the Eastern District of Wisconsin.
 Baumgart v. Wendelberger (2002), corrections to the previous 2002 decision. 
 2011 Wisc. Act 43

See also
 Elections in Wisconsin
 Political party strength in Wisconsin
 2020 United States census
 2020 United States redistricting cycle

References

External links
 
 Draw Your District at Wisconsin Legislature

Redistricting in the United States
Politics of Wisconsin
Government of Wisconsin